Xavier Jayakumar s/o Arulanandam (born 1953) is a Malaysian politician who served as Minister of Water, Land and Natural Resources in the Pakatan Harapan (PH) administration under former prime minister Mahathir Mohamad from July 2018, to the collapse of the PH administration in February 2020, and Member of Parliament (MP) for Kuala Langat from May 2018 to November 2022. He was also Selangor State Executive Councillor (EXCO) from March 2008 to May 2013, and member of the Selangor State Legislative Assembly (MLA) for Seri Andalas from March 2008 to May 2018. He was a former member and vice-president of the People's Justice Party (PKR), a component party of the PH opposition coalition.

Political career

Minister of Land, Water and Natural Resources
He had proposed to amend the National Land Code passed in 2014 which allows the ownership of land to foreign citizens and companies through Section 433B with the approval of the state government.

On 1 May 2019, Xavier gave himself a rating of seven to eight out of 10 for his performance as the Water, Land and Natural Resources Minister in the Pakatan Harapan government, after being in the position for about a year.

On 17 February 2021, a person he described as a fellow party member and "close family friend" was arrested with two others by the Malaysian Anti-Corruption Commission in relation to a contract awarded in 2019 under the jurisdiction of his ministry.

People's Justice Party and defection
He was the Vice President of PKR. In the 2018 Malaysian general election, he was appointed as the Pakatan Harapan Election Director for the Selangor state.

On 13 March 2021, he suddenly announced that he resigned as both a member and as a party vice-president, citing that he was "extremely frustrated" by the events of the past year. Subsequently, he would become an Independent MP while declaring his full support to Perikatan Nasional's leadership.

On the same day, PKR Member of Parliament Sivarasa Rasiah claimed that Xavier defected due to pressure arising from the Malaysian Anti-Corruption Commission's investigation into a contract awarded in 2019 to several people including Xavier's "close family friend" during his tenure as minister.

Elections
He contested in the 2004 Malaysian general election in the Ampang which saw him lose to Barisan Nasional candidate, Rozaidah Talib.

After losing to grab the Parliamentary seat, he has contested in the Selangor State Assembly seat, Seri Andalas. Fate has sided with him and won the seat in the 2008 Malaysian general election. After winning, he was appointed as a Member of the Selangor State Executive Council.

In the 2013 Malaysian general election, he managed to defend the Seri Andalas seat in a 5-cornered contest.

Election results

Honours

Honour of Malaysia
  :
  Knight Commander of the Order of the Life of the Crown of Kelantan (DJMK) – Dato' (2019)

References 

Living people
1953 births
Malaysian people of Indian descent
Independent politicians in Malaysia
Former People's Justice Party (Malaysia) politicians
Members of the Dewan Rakyat
Government ministers of Malaysia
Selangor state executive councillors
Members of the Selangor State Legislative Assembly
21st-century Malaysian politicians